666 International is the third full-length album by Norwegian black metal band Dødheimsgard. It was released on June 11, 1999, by Moonfog Productions.

With 666 International, Dødheimsgard abandoned the black metal style of their previous two albums, further developing the style of their EP Satanic Art (1998). The album heads into a more avant-garde style that fuses black and industrial metal, with some electronic and keyboard interludes.

666 International was Dødheimsgard's last release to feature Aldrahn on vocals (until his eventual return to the band in 2013, when the band recorded A Umbra Omega with him), Apollyon on bass, and Svein Egil Hatlevik on keyboards. It was also their last release under the name Dødheimsgard; in 2003, the band shortened their name to DHG.

The piano intro on "Shiva-Interfere" is taken from the outro track "Wrapped in Plastic" from Satanic Art.

It was re-released in 2011 by Peaceville Records, and included two bonus tracks. "Hæmorrhage Era One Reconstructed" was originally featured on the 2000 compilation Moonfog 2000: A Different Perspective.

Critical reception

William York of AllMusic called 666 International "an elaborate, ambitious and creative album that is bound to frustrate purists".

Track listing

Personnel

Dødheimsgard
 Aldrahn (Bjørn Dencker Gjerde) – guitars, vocals
 Vicotnik (Yusaf Parvez) – guitars
 Apollyon (Ole Jørgen Moe) – bass
 Czral (Carl-Michael Eide) – drums, percussion
 Mr. Magic Logic (Svein Egil Hatlevik) – keyboards

Additional personnel
 Bjørn Boge – production, engineering, mixing
 Tom "Thrawn" Kvålsvoll – mastering

References

External links
 

1999 albums
Dødheimsgard albums